This an alphabetical list of ancient Greeks. These include ethnic Greeks from Greece and the Mediterranean world up to about 200 AD.

A
Abronychus – Athenian commander and diplomat
Acacius of Caesarea – bishop of Caesarea
Acesias – physician
Acestorides – tyrant of Syracuse
Achaeus – general
Achaeus of Eretria – poet
Achermus – sculptor
Achilles Tatius – writer
Acron – physician
Acrotatus I – son of King Cleomenes of Sparta
Acrotatus II – King of Sparta, grandson of the above
Acusilaus – scholar
Adeimantus – Corinthian general
Adrianus – sophist
Aglaophon – painter 
Aedesia – female Neoplatonic philosopher
Aedesius – philosopher
Aegineta – modeller
Aeimnestus – Spartan soldier
Aelianus Tacticus – military writer
Aelius Aristides – orator and writer
Aeneas Tacticus – writer
Aenesidemus – Sceptic philosopher
Aeropus I of Macedon – king
Aeropus II of Macedon – king
Aesara – female Pythagorean philosopher
Aeschines Socraticus – Socratic philosopher
Aeschines – Athenian orator
Aeschines – Physician
Aeschylus – playwright
Aesop – author of fables
Aetion – painter
Aetius – philosopher
Agallis – female grammarian
Agarista – see Agariste
Agariste of Sicyon, daughter of the tyrant of Sicyon, Cleisthenes.
Agariste, daughter of Hippocrates, wife of Xanthippus, and mother of Pericles.
Agasias – sculptor
Agasicles – King of Sparta
Agatharchides – historian and geographer
Agatharchus – painter
Agatharchus of Syracuse – naval commander
Agathias – historian
Agathinus – medicine
Agathocles – tyrant of Syracuse
Agathocles of Bactria – Indo-Greek king
Agathon – tragic poet
Agathotychus – veterinary surgeon
Ageladas – sculptor
Agesander – sculptor
Agesilaus I – King of Sparta
Agesilaus II – King of Sparta
Agesipolis I – King of Sparta
Agesipolis II – King of Sparta
Agesipolis III – King of Sparta
Agis I – King of Sparta
Agis II – King of Sparta
Agis III – King of Sparta
Agis IV – King of Sparta
Aglaonike – first female astronomer of Ancient Greece
Agnodike – female Athenian physician and gynecologist
Agoracritus – sculptor
Agresphon – philologist
Agrippa – astronomer
Agroetas – historian
Agyrrhius – Athenian politician c. 400 BC
Albinus – philosopher
Alcaeus – comic and lyric poet
Alcaeus of Messene –  Greek author of a number of epigrams
Alcaeus of Mytilene – playwright
Alcamenes – sculptor
Alcetas I of Macedon – King of Macedon
Alcibiades – Athenian general
Alcidamas – sophist
Alciphron – sophist
Alcisthene – female painter
Alcmaeon of Croton – physician
Alcman – lyric poet 7th century BC
Alcmenes – King of Sparta
Alexander Aetolus – poet
Alexander Balas – Seleucid king of Syria
Alexander Cornelius – grammarian
Alexander I of Epirus- king of Epirus (also known as Alexander Molossus)
Alexander I of Molossia
Alexander II of Epirus – king of Epirus
Alexander II of Molossia
Alexander of Abonuteichos – cult leader
Alexander of Aphrodisias – Peripatetic philosopher
Alexander of Greece – rhetorician
Alexander of Pherae – tyrant
Alexander Polyhistor – writer
Alexander the Great – King of Macedon
Alexandrides – historian
Alexias – physician
Alexion – physician
Alexis – playwright
Alexis – sculptor, pupil of Polykleitos
Alypius of Alexandria – music writer
Ambryon – writer
Ameinias of Athens - Athenian commander during the Greco-Persian Wars
Ameinocles – Corinthian inventor of the trireme
Ameipsias – Athenian comic poet
Amelesagoras – writer
Amelius – philosopher
Amentes – surgeon
Ammonius Grammaticus – writer
Ammonius Hermiae – philosopher
Ammonius Saccas – philosopher
Amphicrates – king of Samos
Amphis – Middle Comedy poet
Amynander – king of Athamania
Anacharsis – philosopher
Anacreon – lyric poet 6th century BC
Anaxagoras – philosopher
Anaxander – King of Sparta
Anaxandra – female artist of Sicyon
Anaxandridas I – King of Sparta
Anaxandridas II – King of Sparta
Anaxandrides – philosopher
Anaxarchus – philosopher
Anaxidamus – King of Sparta
Anaxilas of Rhegium – tyrant
Anaxilas – Middle Comedy poet
Anaxilaus – physician
Anaximander – philosopher
Anaximenes of Lampsacus – historian
Anaximenes of Miletus – philosopher
Anaxippus – New Comedy poet
Andocides – two; Athenian politician, potter
Andreas – physician
Andriscus – Adramyttian adventurer
Andromachus of Cyprus – admiral of Alexander the Great 
Andron – writer
Andronicus of Cyrrhus – astronomer
Andronicus Rhodius – Peripatetic philosopher
Androsthenes – navigator
Androtion – Athenian politician and writer
Anniceris – philosopher
 Anonymus (author of Antiatticista), an opponent of Phrynichus Arabius
Anser – erotic poet
Antagoras of Rhodes – writer
Antalcidas – Spartan general
Antenor – sculptor
Anthemius of Tralles – architect
Anticleides – writer
Antidorus of Cyme – grammarian
Antigenes – Attic poet
Antigonus of Carystus – scholar
Antigonus II Gonatas – King of Macedon
Antigonus III Doson – King of Macedon
Antigonus III of Macedon – King of Macedon
Antimachus – poet and scholar
Antimachus I – Greco-Bactrian king
Antinous – lover of Hadrian
Antiochis – Seleucid queen of Cappadochia
Antiochus of Ascalon – philosopher
Antiochus I Soter – Seleucid king of Syria
Antiochus II Theos – Seleucid king of Syria
Antiochus III the Great – Seleucid king of Syria
Antiochus IV Epiphanes – Seleucid king of Syria
Antiochus IX Cyzicenus – Seleucid king of Syria
Antiochus V Eupator – Seleucid king of Syria
Antiochus VI Dionysus – Seleucid king of Syria
Antiochus VII Sidetes – Seleucid king of Syria
Antiochus VIII Grypus – Seleucid king of Syria
Antiochus X Eusebes – Seleucid king of Syria
Antiochus XI Ephiphanes – Seleucid king of Syria
Antiochus XII Dionysus – Seleucid king of Syria
Antiochus XIII Asiaticus – Seleucid king of Syria
Antipater II of Macedon – King of Macedon
Antipater III of Macedon – King of Macedon
Antipater of Sidon – writer
Antipater of Tarsus – philosopher
Antipater of Thessalonica – epigrammatist
Antipater of Tyre – philosopher
Antipater – Macedonian general
Antiphanes – playwright
Antiphemus – one of the founders of the city of Gela
Antiphilus – writer
Antiphon – three; two Athenian orators, tragic poet
Antisthenes – two; philosopher, writer
Antonius Diogenes – writer
Antoninus Liberalis – grammarian
Antyllus – physician
Anyte of Tegea – poet
Anytos – Athenian general
Apega of Sparta – wife of Nabis
Apelles – painter
Apellicon – book collector
Apion – scholar
Apollocrates – tyrant of Syracuse
Apollodorus of Alexandria – physician
Apollodorus of Athens – scholar
Apollodorus of Carystus – New Comedy poet
Apollodorus of Damascus – architect
Apollodorus of Gela – New Comedy poet
Apollodorus of Phaleron – student of Socrates
Apollodorus of Pergamon – rhetor
Apollodorus of Seleuceia on the Tigris – Stoic philosopher
Apollodorus – several; painter, grammarian, comic playwright, architect
Apollodotus I – Indo-Greek king
Apollonius – finance minister of Egypt
Apollonius Molon – rhetor
Apollonius Mys – physician
Apollonius of Citium – physician
Apollonius of Perga – mathematician
Apollonius of Rhodes – writer and librarian
Apollonius of Tyana – Neopythagorean sage
Apollonius Sophista – scholar
Apollonius – several; philosopher and mathematician
Apollophanes – comedian
Apollos – early Christian
Appian – historian
Apsines – Roman-era Athenian rhetorician
Arachidamia – wealthy Spartan queen
Araros – son of Aristophanes
Aratus – two; scholar, statesman
Arcesilas – four Cyrene kings
Arcesilaus – two; philosopher, sculptor
Archidameia – name of several women
Archidamis (Ἀρχίδαμις) – daughter of the Spartan King Cleadas
Archedemus of Tarsus – Stoic philosopher
Archedicus – New Comedy poet
Archelaus I – King of Macedon
Archelaus II – King of Macedon
Archelaus – five; philosopher, Pontic army officer, phrourarch, son of Androcles, Judaean ruler
Archermus – sculptor
Archestratus – two; Athenian general, writer
Archinus – Athenian politician
Architimus – writer
Archias – poet
Archidamus I – King of Sparta
Archidamus II – King of Sparta
Archidamus III – King of Sparta
Archidamus IV – King of Sparta
Archidamus V – King of Sparta
Archigenes – physician
Archilochus – poet
Archimedes – mathematician
Archinos – Archon
Archippas – Athenian comic poet
Archytas – philosopher
Arctinus – epic poet
Aretaeus – medical writer
Aretaphila of Cyrene – noblewoman who deposed the tyrant Nicocrates and his co-conspirators
Arete of Cyrene – Cyrenaic philosopher, daughter of Aristippus
Areus I – King of Sparta
Areus II – King of Sparta
Argas – notably bad poet
Argentarius – two; epigrammatist, rhetorician
Arignote – philosopher; student and perhaps daughter of Pythagoras
Arimneste – Aristotle's older sister
Arion – poet
Aristaeus – mathematician
Aristagoras – tyrant of Miletus
Aristander of Telmessus – soothsayer to Alexander the Great
Aristarchus of Samos – astronomer and mathematician
Aristarchus of Samothrace – critic and grammarian
Aristarchus of Tegea – tragedian
Aristeas – poet
Aristeus – Corinthian general
Aristias – playwright
Aristides of Miletus – writer
Aristides Quintilianus – writer
Aristides – three; Athenian statesman, two painters
Aristippus – philosopher
Aristobulus of Cassandreia and Aristobulus of Paneas – two; historian, commentator
Aristocles – three; Spartan general, two scholars
Aristodemus – three; Spartan hero, Roman hero, historian
Aristodemus of Cydathenaeum – student of Socrates
Aristogiton – Athenian tyrannicide
Aristolycus of Athens – athlete
Aristomenes – two; Messenian hero, Athenian comedian
Ariston of Alexandria – philosopher
Ariston of Ceos – philosopher
Ariston of Chios – philosopher
Ariston (king of Sparta) – King of Sparta
Aristonicus of Pergamum – Attalid king of Pergamum
Aristonicus – grammarian
Aristonous – citharode
Aristonymus – comedian
Aristophanes of Byzantium – scholar
Aristophanes – playwright
Aristophon – Athenian politician
Aristotle – two; philosopher, Athenian general
Aristoxenus – philosopher and music theorist
Arius Didymus – philosophy teacher
Arius – Christian heretic
Arrian – historian
Arsecilas – king of Cyrene
Arsinoe I of Egypt – Ptolemaic ruler of Egypt
Arsinoe II of Egypt – Ptolemaic ruler of Egypt
Arsinoe III of Egypt – Ptolemaic ruler of Egypt
Artemidorus – three; grammarian, two travellers
Artemisia I of Caria (fl. 480 BC), queen of Halicarnassus under the First Persian Empire, naval commander during the second Persian invasion of Greece
Artemisia II of Caria (died 350 BC), queen of Caria under the First Persian Empire, ordered the construction of the Mausoleum at Halicarnassus
Artemon – five scholars
Artemon – painter
Artemon of Clazomenae – engineer
Arxilaidas (Ἀρξιλαΐδας) - Laconian general
Asclepiades – four scholars
Asclepigenia – Athenian mystic and philosopher, daughter of Plutarch of Athens
Asclepiodotus – scholar
Asius of Samos – poet
Asmonius – grammarian
Aspasia – hetaera of Pericles
Aspasius – philosopher
Astydamas – two poets
Astyochus – Spartan general
Athenaeus – two scholars, physician
Athenais – prophet who told Alexander the Great of his allegedly divine ancestry
Athenagoras of Athens – apologist
Athenodorus – philosopher
Athenodorus – actor 
Attalus I – Attalid king of Pergamum
Attalus II – Attalid king of Pergamum
Attalus III – Attalid king of Pergamum
Autocrates – Athenian comic poet
Autolycus of Pitane – astronomer
Avaris – priest of Apollo (or Abaris the Hyperborean?)
Axiochus – Alcmaeonid aristocrat
Axionicus – Middle Comedy poet
Axiothea of Phlius – female student of Plato

B

Babrius – fabulist
Bacchylides – poet
Basil of Caesarea – Christian saint
Basilides – philosopher
Bathycles of Magnesia – sculptor
Battus – founder of Cyrene
Berenice I of Egypt – Ptolemaic ruler of Egypt
Berenice II of Egypt – Ptolemaic ruler of Egypt
Berenice IV of Egypt – Ptolemaic ruler of Egypt
Bias of Priene, one of the Seven Sages of Greece
Bion
Bion the Borysthenite
Biton of Syracuse
Boethus – two sculptors
Boethus of Sidon – two philosophers
Bolus – writer
Boukris – pirate 
Brasidas – Spartan general
Brygus – potter
Bryson – philosopher
Bupalus – sculptor

C
Cadmus of Miletus – one of the first logographers
Caecilius of Calacte – rhetorician
Caesarion – son of Cleopatra VII, possibly by Julius Caesar
Calamis – 2 sculptors
Calliades – archon of Athens
Callia – three; Athenian statesman, comic poet, nobleman
Callias of Syracuse – historian
Callicrates – architect
Calicrates of Leontium – Acheaean statesman
Callicratidas – Spartan general
Callicratidas of Cyrene, a general
Callicratides – Spartan general
Callimachus (polemarch) – Athenian general
Callimachus (sculptor) – sculptor
Callimachus – poet
Callinus – poet
Calliphon – philosopher
Callippides – runner
Callippus – astronomer
Callisthenes – historian
Callisthenes (Seleucid)
Callistratus – four; grammarian, poet, sophist, orator
Carcinus (writer) – tragedian
Carneades – philosopher
Cassander – King of Macedon
Castor of Rhodes – rhetorician
Cebes – two philosophers
Celsus – theologian
Cephidorus – two; Old Comedy poet, writer
Cephisodotus – two sculptors
Cercidas – politician/philosopher/poet
Cercops of Miletus – poet
Chabrias – Athenian general
Chaeremon – tragic poet
Chaeremon of Alexandria – teacher
Chaeris – writer
Chaeron of Pellene – tyrant of Pellene
Chamaeleon – writer
Charax (writer) – writer
Chares of Athens – general
Chares of Lindos – sculptor
Chares of Mytilene – historian
Charidemus – Euboean soldier
Charillus – King of Sparta
Chariton – writer
Charmadas – philosopher
Charmidas – Athenian noble
Charmus – Athenian polemarch
Charon of Lampsacus – writer
Charondas – lawgiver
Cheramyes – nobleman of Samos
Cheilonis (Χειλωνὶς) - wife of the Spartan King Theopompus
Chilon – Spartan ephor
Chionides – comic poet
Choerilus – Athenian tragic poet
Choerilus of Iasus – epic poet
Choerilus of Samos – epic poet
Chremonides – Athenian statesman
Christodorus – epic poet
Chrysanthius – philosopher
Chrysippus – philosopher
Dio Chrysostom – orator
John Chrysostom – theologian
Cimon – Athenian statesman
Cimon of Cleonae – painter
Cinaethon of Lacedaemon – epic poet
Cineas – Thessalian diplomat
Cineas (Athenian) – fought at the Battle of Mantinea (362 BC)
Cinesias – Athenian poet
Cleadas (Κλεάδας) – father of Cheilonis who was the wife of the Spartan King Theopompus
Cleandridas – Spartan statesman
Cleanthes – philosopher
Clearchus of Athens – comic poet
Clearchus of Herachleia
Clearchus of Rhegium – sculptor, teacher of Pythagoras
Clearchus of Sparta – general, son of Rhampias
Clearchus of Soli – author, pupil of Aristotle
Clearidas (general) – Spartan general
Cledonius – grammarian
Cleidemus – atthidographer
Cleinias – Athenian general, father of Alcibiades
Cleisthenes – Athenian statesman
Cleisthenes of Sicyon – tyrant of Sicyon
Cleitarchus – historian
Cleitus – two Macedonian nobles
Clement of Alexandria – theologian
Cleombrotus I – King of Sparta
Cleomedes – astronomer
Cleomenes I – King of Sparta
Cleomenes II – King of Sparta
Cleomenes III – King of Sparta
Cleomenes (seer) – seer
Cleomenes of Naucratis – administrator
Cleon – Athenian statesman
Cleon of Sicyon – tyrant
Cleonides – writer
Cleonymus – Spartan general
Cleopatra I of Egypt – Ptolemaic ruler of Egypt
Cleopatra II of Egypt – Ptolemaic ruler of Egypt
Cleopatra III of Egypt – Ptolemaic ruler of Egypt
Cleopatra IV of Egypt – Ptolemaic ruler of Egypt
Cleopatra Thea – Seleucid king of Syria
Cleopatra V of Egypt – Ptolemaic ruler of Egypt
Cleopatra V of Egypt – Ptolemaic ruler of Egypt
Cleopatra VI of Egypt – Ptolemaic ruler of Egypt
Cleopatra VII of Egypt – Ptolemaic ruler of Egypt
Cleophon – two; Athenian statesman, tragic poet
Clitomachus (philosopher) – philosopher
Clitophon – oligarchic statesman
Cnemus – Spartan general
Colaeus – explorer
Colluthus – epic poet
Colotes (sculptor) – sculptor
Colotes of Lampsacus – philosopher
Comeas – archon of Athens
Conon – Athenian general
Conon of Samos – astronomer
Conon (mythographer) – mythographer
Corinna – poet
Cosmas Indicopleustes – explorer
Crantor – philosopher
Craterus of Macedon – King of Macedon
Crates of Thebes – philosopher
Crates of Mallus – grammarian and philosopher
Crates of Olynthys – architect
Cratesipolis – queen
Cratippus – historian
Cratylus – philosopher
Creon – archon of Athens
Cresilas – sculptor
Critias – one of the Thirty Tyrants
Critius – sculptor
Crito – several
Critolaus – general
Croesus – king of Lydia
Ctesias – physician and historian
Ctesibius – scientist
Cylon – attempted usurper in Athens
Cynaethus – writer
Cynegeirus – heroic soldier
Cynisca – female Spartan athlete
Cypselus – tyrant of Corinth

D 

Daimachus – two writers
Daman – philosopher
Damascius – philosopher
Damastes – writer
Damasias – archon of Athens
Damocles – courtier of sword fame
Damon of Athens – writer on music
Damon of Syracus – philosopher
Damophilus – painter
Damophon – sculptor
Damoxenus – New Comedy playwright
Dares of Phrygia – writer
Deinocrates (also spelled Dinocrates) –  architect
Deidamia of Scyros –  princess
Deidamia I of Epirus –  princess
Deidamia II of Epirus –  princess
Deinias – writer of the 4th century BC
Deiphontes – king of Argos
Demades – orator
Demaratus – King of Sparta
Demetrius – epistolographer
Demetrius – comic playwright
Demetrius (son of Pythonax) – companion of Alexander the Great 
Demetrius – rhetorical stylist
Demetrius – Indo-Greek king
Demetrius I of Bactria – Greek king of Bactria
Demetrius I of Syria – Seleucid king of Syria
Demetrius I Poliorcetes – King of Macedon
Demetrius II – Indo-Greek king
Demetrius II of Macedon – King of Macedon
Demetrius II of Syria – Seleucid king of Syria
Demetrius III Eucaerus – Seleucid king of Syria
Demetrius Ixion – grammarian
Demetrius Lacon – Epicurean philosopher
Demetrius of Alopece – sculptor
Demetrius of Magnesia – writer
Demetrius of Pharos – ruler in Illyria
Demetrius of Scepsis – grammarian and archaeologist
Demetrius of Tarsus – grammarian
Demetrius of Troezen – literary historian
Demetrius Phalereus – philosopher and statesman
Demetrius the Cynic – philosopher
Demetrius the Fair – son of Demetrius I Poliorcetes
Democedes – physician
Democritus – philosopher
Demon – writer
Demonax – philosopher
Demonax (lawmaker) – Arcadian lawmaker
Demophanes – philosopher active in public life
Demophon (seer)
Demosthenes (general) – Athenian general
Demosthenes – Athenian orator
Demosthenes of Bithynia – poet
Dercyllidas – Spartan commander
Dexippus – historian
Diagoras – poet
Diagoras of Rhodes (winner of boxing, 79th Olympiad, 464 BC)
Dicaearchus – geographer
Dicaeogenes – tragic poet
Dictys Cretensis – writer
Didymarchus – writer
Didymus Chalcenterus – grammarian
Didymus the Blind – theologian
Didymus the Musician – music theorist
Dienekes – Spartan officer
Dinarchus – orator
Dinocrates (also spelled Deinocrates) –  architect
Dinon – historian
Dio Cocceianus – orator and philosopher
Diocles – four; politician, poet, mathematician, rhetor
Diocles of Carystus – physician
Diocles of Magnesia – philosopher
Diodorus of Alexandria – mathematician and astronomer
Diodorus of Sinope – New Comedy playwright
Diodorus Cronus – philosopher
Diodorus Siculus – historian
Diodotus the Stoic – Cicero's teacher
Diodotus of Bactria – Seleucid king of Bactria
Diodotus II – Greco-Bactrian king
Diodotus Tryphon – Seleucid king of Syria
Dioetas (Διοίτας) – Achaean general 
Diogenes Apolloniates – philosopher
Diogenes Laërtius – biographer
Diogenes of Babylon – philosopher
Diogenes of Oenoanda – Epicurean
Diogenes of Sinope – Cynic philosopher
Diogenes of Tarsus – Epicurean
Diogenianus – two; Epicurean, grammarian
Diomedes – grammarian
Dion – tyrant of Syracuse
Dionysius Aelius – lexicographer
Dionysius the Areopagite – Athenian convert
Dionysius of Byzantium – writer
Dionysius Chalcus – poet
Dionysius of Halicarnassus – historian
Dionysius of Heraclea – writer
Dionysius Periegetes – geographic writer
Dionysius of Philadelphia – writer
Dionysius of Phocaea – Ionian general
Dionysius of Samos – writer
Dionysius Scytobrachion – grammarian
Dionysius of Sinope – Middle Comedy playwright
Dionysius of Syracuse – tyrant of Syracuse
Dionysius II – tyrant of Syracuse
Dionysius of Thebes – poet
Dionysius Trax or Thrax – grammarian
Dionysius son of Calliphron – poet
Dionysodorus – sophist
Diophantus – mathematician
Dios – historian
Dioscorides – Stoic philosopher
Dioscorides Pedanius – physician
Diotima – female philosopher
Diotimus – two; poet, Athenian general
Diotogenes – Pythagorean writer
Diphilus – comic playwright
Dorieus – Spartan prince
Dorissus – King of Sparta
Dorotheus of Sidon – astrological poet
Dorotheus – 6th-century jurist
Dorotheus of Ascalon - writer
Dosiadas – poet
Dositheus – two; astronomer, grammarian
Draco – Athenian lawmaker
Dracon – writer
Dropidas (Δρωπίδας) – father of Cleitus the Black
Duris – Athenian potter and vase painter
Duris – historian, tyrant of Samos

E

Echecrates – philosopher
Echestratus – King of Sparta
Ecphantides – comic playwright
Ecphantus – philosopher
Eirenaeus – grammarian
Eirene – Woman artist
Elpinice – Athenian noblewoman and daughter of Miltiades, known for confronting Pericles twice.
Empedocles – philosopher
Entimus (Ἔντιμος) – one of the founders of the city of Gela
Entochus – sculptor
Epaminondas – Theban general
Epaphroditus of Chaeronea – scholar
Ephialtes – Athenian statesman
Ephialtes of Trachis – traitor
Ephippus – Middle Comedy playwright
Ephippus – pamphleteer
Ephorus – historian
Epicharmus of Kos – writer
Epicles – name of several different individuals
Epicrates – Middle Comedy playwright
Epictetus – philosopher
Epictetus – Athenian potter and vasepainter
Epicurus – philosopher
Epigenes – two playwrights
Epigenes, son of Antiphon, disciple of Socrates
Epigenes of Sicyon, tragic poet
Epilycus – writer
Epimenides – seer
Epinicus – comic poet
Epiphanius of Salamis – theologian
Epitadas – Spartan general
Epitadeus – Spartan statesman
Erasistratus – physician
Eratosthenes – geographer
Erinna – poet
Eriphus – Middle Comedy poet
Erucius of Cyzicus – writer
Eryximachus – physician
Eryxo – Queen of Cyrenaica 
Euangelus – New Comedy poet
Euanthius – writer
Eubulides of Miletus – philosopher
Eubulus (statesman) – Athenian statesman
Eubulus (playwright) – Middle Comedy playwright
Eucleidas – King of Sparta
Eucleides – two; philosopher, archon
Euclid – mathematician
Eucratides – Greco-Bactrian king
Euctemon – astronomer
Eudamidas I – King of Sparta
Eudamidas II – King of Sparta
Eudamidas III – King of Sparta
Eudemus of Cyprus – philosopher
Eudemus of Rhodes – philosopher
Eudorus of Alexandria – philosopher
Eudoxus of Cnidus – mathematician
Eudoxus of Cyzicus – explorer
Eudoxus of Rhodes – historian
Euenus – poet
Euetes – writer
Eugammon – epic poet
Euhemerus – mythographer
Eumelus (poet) – Corinthian poet
Eumenes I – Attalid king of Pergamum
Eumenes II – Attalid king of Pergamum
Eumenes of Cardia – secretary
Eumenius – rhetoric teacher
Eumolpidae – one of the families who ran the Eleusinian mysteries
Eunapius – sophist
Eunomus – King of Sparta
Euphantus – writer and teacher
Euphemus – Athenian general
Euphorion – philosopher
Euphorion son of Aeschylus – playwright
Euphranor – sculptor and painter
Euphron – New Comedy playwright
Euphronius – potter and vasepainter
Eupolis – Old Comedy playwright
Eurybatus – Corcyrean general
Eurybiades – Spartan general
Eurycrates – King of Sparta
Eurycratides – King of Sparta
Eurydice of Egypt – Ptolemaic queen of Egypt, wife of Ptolemy I Soter
Eurydice of Athens – A descendant of Miltiades and a wife of Demetrius I of Macedon
Eurydice (wife of Antipater II of Macedon) – Princess and wife of Antipater II of Macedon
Eurylochus – Spartan general
Eurymedon – Athenian general
Euripides – playwright
Eurypon – King of Sparta
Eurysthenes – King of Sparta
Eusebius of Caesarea – Christian historian
Euthydemus – sophist
Euthydemus I – Seleucid king of Bactria
Euthydemus II – Indo-Greek king
Euthymides – vasepainter
Eutychides – sculptor and painter
Euthyphro – prophet
Euxenides – playwright
Evagoras of Salamis – rebel
Exekias – potter and vasepainter

F

Favorinus – philosopher

G

Galen – physician
Gastron (Γάστρων) – Spartan commander
Gelo – tyrant of Syracuse
George – Soldier of the Roman Army and Christian Saint
Glaphya – hetaera
Glaucus of Chios – inventor of iron welding
Glaucus of Rhegium – writer
Glycon – poet
Glycon of Athens – sculptor
Gnathaena – courtesan
Gorgias – two orators
Gorgidas – Theban military leader
Gregory of Nyssa – Christian saint
Gryton – Boeotian potter 
Gylippus – Spartan general

H

Habron – grammarian
Hagnodorus – Athenian political figure 
Hagnon – Athenian colonizer
Hagnon of Tarsus – rhetorician and philosopher
Hagnothemis – alleged that Alexander the Great had been poisoned
Harmodius and Aristogeiton – assassins
Harpalus – friend of Alexander the Great
Harpalus (son of Polemaeus) – Macedonian statesman
Hecataeus of Abdera – historian of Egypt
Hecataeus of Miletus – historian
Hecatomnus – ruler in Asia
Hecato of Rhodes – Stoic philosopher
Hedylus – epigrammatist
Hegemon of Thasos – parodist
Hegesander – writer
Hegesias of Cyrene – philosopher
Hegesias of Magnesia – historian
Hegesippus – Athenian statesman
Hegesippus (poet) – New Comedy poet
Hegesippus (epigrammatist) – epigrammatist
Hegesipyle – mother of Cimon
Hegesistratus – son of Pisistratus
Hegetorides – a Thasian during the Peloponnesian War 
Heliocles – Greco-Bactrian king
Heliodorus of Athens – author
Heliodorus (metrist)
Heliodorus (surgeon)
Heliodurus – ambassador
Hellanicus of Lesbos – logographer
Hephaestion – Companion of Alexander the Great
Hephaistio of Thebes – astrologer
Heracleides – tyrant of Syracuse
Heraclides Ponticus – philosopher
Heraclitus – philosopher
Hermaeus – Indo-Greek king
Hermagoras – rhetorician
Hermesianax – poet
Hermias (philosopher)
Hermias of Atarneus, tyrant, pupil of Plato
Hermippus – comic playwright
Hermocrates – Syracusan general
Hero of Alexandria – scientist
Aelius Herodianus – grammarian
Herodotus – historian
Herophilus – physician
Herostratus – arsonist
Hesiod – poet
Hesychius of Alexandria – grammarian
Hicetas – philosopher
Hiero I of Syracuse – tyrant of Syracuse
Hiero II of Syracuse – tyrant of Syracuse
Hierocles of Alexandria – philosopher
Hierophon – Athenian general
Hippalus – explorer
Hipparchus (brother of Hippias) – tyrant of Athens
Hipparchus – mathematician and astronomer
Hippias (tyrant) – tyrant of Athens
Hippias – philosopher
Hippocleides – archon of Athens
Hippocrates – two; physician, Athenian general
Hippodamus – architect
Hippodamas (Ἱπποδάμας) – Spartan general 
Hippolus – mariner
Hipponax – poet
Hipponicus – Athenian general
Hipponoidas – Spartan general
Histiaeus – tyrant of Miletus
Homer – poet
Hypatia of Alexandria – philosopher
Hyperbolus – Athenian statesman
Hypereides – orator
Hypsicles – mathematician and astronomer
Hypsicrates – historian
Herippidas (Ηριπίδας) – Spartan general

I

Iamblichus (writer) – novelist
Iamblichus (philosopher) – Neoplatonist philosopher
Iambulus – writer
Iasus – two early kings
Ibycus – poet
Ictinus – architect
Idomeneus (writer) – writer of Lampsacus
Ion of Chios – poet
Iophon – tragedian
Iphicrates – Athenian general
Irenaeus – theologian
Isaeus – orator
Isaeus (Syrian rhetor)
Isagoras – archon of Athens
Ischolaus (Ἰσχόλαος) – Spartan general
Isidas (Ἰσίδας) – Spartan who attacked the Theban garrison at the Gytheio
Isidore of Alexandria – Neoplatonist philosopher
Isidorus of Miletus – architect
Isigonus – writer
Isocrates – rhetorician; Spartan general
Ister of Cyrene – writer
Istros the Callimachean
Isyllus – poet
Illithia – birth

J

Jason of Pherae – Thessalian general

K

Karanus of Macedon – King of Macedon
Karkinos – painter
Kerykes – one of the families who ran the Eleusinian mysteries
Kleoitas – architect
Koinos of Macedon – King of Macedon

L

Lacedaimonius – Athenian general
Lachares – tyrant of Athens
Laches – Athenian aristocrat and general
Lacritus – sophist
Lacydes – philosopher
Lais of Corinth – hetaera
Lais of Hyccara – hetaera
Lamachus – Athenian general
Lamprocles – Athenian musician and poet
Lamprus of Erythrae – philosopher
Lanike – mother of Cleitus the Black
Lasus of Hermione – poet
Leochares – sculptor
Leon – King of Sparta
Leonidas I – King of Sparta
Leonidas II – King of Sparta
Leonida of Alexandria – astrologer and poet
Leonnatus – Macedonian noble
Leosthenes – Athenian general
Leotychidas II – King of Sparta
Leotychides – Spartan general
Lesbonax – writer
Lesches – epic poet
Leucippus – philosopher
Leucon – Old Comedy poet
Libanius – writer
Licymnius of Chios – poet
Livius Andronicus – poet, dramaturg, colonist and slave
Lobon – literary forger
Longinus – literary critic
Longus – writer
Lucian – writer
Lyco – philosopher
Lycophron – three; poet, son of Periander, Spartan general
Lycortas – statesman and father of Polybius
Lycurgus of Arcadia, king
Lycurgus of Athens, one of the ten notable orators at Athens, (4th century BC)
Lycurgus (of Nemea), king
Lycurgus of Sparta, creator of constitution of Sparta
Lycurgus of Thrace, king, opponent of Dionysus
Lycurgus, a.k.a. Lycomedes, in Homer
Lycus – historian
Lydiadas – Megalopolitan general
Lygdamis of Naxos – tyrant of Naxos
Lygdamus – poet
Lysander – Spartan general
Lysanias – philologist
Lysias – orator
Lysimachus – Macedonian general
Lysippus – two; poet, sculptor
Lysis – two; philosopher, actor
Lysistratus – sculptor

M

Machaon – Spartan general
Machon – New Comedy poet
Magas of Macedon  –  Macedonian nobleman
Magas of Cyrene  –  King of Cyrenaica
Magas of Egypt  –  grandson of Magas of Cyrene
Marcellus of Side – physician and poet
Marinus – philosopher
Marsyas of Pella – writer
Matris of Thebes – rhetor
Matron of Pitane – parodist
Maximus of Smyrna – anatomist and philosopher
Megacles – numerous; archon of Athens, Athenian statesman, various other Athenians
Megacleidas (Μεγακλείδας) –  general
Megasthenes – traveller
Meidias – Athenian potter
Melanippides – poet
Melanthius – three; tragedian, painter, writer
Melas – sculptor
Meleager of Gadara – poet and anthologist
Meleager of Macedon – King of Macedon
Melesagoras of Chalcedon – writer
Meletus – two; tragedian, son
Melinno – poet
Melissus of Samos – Eleatic philosopher
Memnon of Heraclea Pontica – historian
Memnon of Rhodes – military leader
Menaechmus – mathematician
Menander – playwright
Menander I (Menander I Soter, known in Indian Pāḷi sources as Milinda) – Indo-Greek king
Menander of Ephesus – writer
Menander of Laodicea – writer
Menecrates of Ephesus – poet
Menecrates of Xanthus – historian
Menedaius – Spartan general
Menedemus of Eretria – poet
Menedemus (Cynic) – Cynic philosopher
Menelaus (sculptor) – sculptor
Menelaus of Alexandria – mathematician
Menestor – botanical writer
Menexenus – student of Socrates
Menippus – satirist
Menippus of Pergamum – writer on geography
Meno – student of Aristotle
Menodotus – writer
Menodotus of Nicomedia – medical writer
Mentor of Rhodes – military leader
Mesatos – tragedian
Metagenes – Athenian comic writer
Meton – astronomer
Metrodorus – five:
Metrodorus of Chios – philosopher
Metrodorus of Lampsacus (the elder) – philosopher
Metrodorus of Lampsacus (the younger) – philosopher
Metrodorus of Scepsis – writer
Metrodorus of Stratonicea – philosopher
Miciades – Corcyrean general
Micciades – sculptor
Micon – Athenian painter and sculptor
Milo of Croton – athlete
Miltiades the Younger – Athenian general 
Miltiades the Elder – political refugee and uncle of the above
Mimnermus – poet
Mindarus – Spartan general
Mnasalces – writer
Mnasippidas (Μνασιππίδας) - general
Mnaseas – traveller
Mnesicles – architect
Mnesimachus – Middle Comedy poet
Moderatus of Gades – philosopher
Moeris – Attic lexicographer
Moiro – poet
Morsimus – poet
Moschion (tragic poet) – tragedian
Moschion (physician) – physician
Moschus – poet
Musaeus of Athens – Athenian poet
Musaeus of Ephesus – Ephesian poet
Myia – daughter of Pythagoras
Myron – sculptor
Myronides – Athenian general
Myrsilus – historian
Myrtilus – Athenian comic poet
Myrtis – Boeotian poet
Myrtis – Athenian girl, whose remains were discovered in 1994–1995

N

Saint Nicholas – Bishop of Myra, Christian saint, main inspiration of the Santa Claus
Nabis – Spartan usurper
Gregory Nazianzus – Bishop of Constantinople
Nearchus – Macedonian general
Neoptolemus of Parion – poet and critic
Nicander – King of Sparta
Nicarchus – poet
Nicias – Athenian statesman
Nicon (also Nikon) (Νίκων) - a pirate from Pherae
King Nicias – Indo-Greek king
Nicocreon – tyrant of Cyprus
Nicomachus – mathematician and neo-Pythagorean
Nicomachus of Thebes – painter
Nicomedes of Sparta, commanded the army of the Peleponnesian League at the Battle of Tanagra (457 BC)
Nicomedes I of Bithynia – king of Bithynia
Nicomedes II of Bithynia – king of Bithynia
Nicomedes III of Bithynia – king of Bithynia
Nicomedes IV of Bithynia – king of Bithynia

O

Olympias – mother of Alexander the Great
Olympiodorus of Thebes – historian
Onesilas of Salamis – rebel
Onomarchus – general of the Phocians
Onomacritus – forger
Orestes of Macedon – King of Macedon
Origen – theologian
Oxylus – son of Haemon

P

Paches (Πάχης) - Athenian general
Paeonius – sculptor
Pagondas – Spartan general
Palladas – poet
Pamphilus – grammarian
Pamphilus – painter
Pamphilus of Caesarea – theologian
Panaetius of Rhodes – philosopher
Pantaleon – Indo-Greek king
Parmenides – philosopher
Parmenion – Macedonian general
Parrhasius – painter
Paulus Alexandrinus – astrologer
Paulus Aegineta – physician
Pausanias of Macedon – King of Macedon
Pausanias of Sparta – King of Sparta
Pausanias – traveller
Pedanius Dioscorides – physician
Peisander – Athenian statesman
Peisander (oligarch)
Peithias – leader of Corcyra
Pelopidas – Theban statesman
Pelops of Sparta – King of Sparta
Perdiccas I of Macedon – King of Macedon
Perdiccas II of Macedon – King of Macedon
Perdiccas III of Macedon – King of Macedon
Periander – tyrant of Corinth, one of the Seven Sages of Greece
Pericles – Athenian statesman
Persephone-the goddess of the underworld
Perseus Argive King
Perseus of Macedon – King of Macedon
Phaedo of Elis – philosopher
Phaedrus – aristocrat
Phaenippus – archon of Athens
Phalaris – tyrant of Agrigentum
Pharacidas – Spartan admiral
Pherecydes of Athens – mythographer
Pherecydes of Syros – philosopher
Pheretima – Cyrenaean queen
Phidias – sculptor
Phidippides – legendary runner
Philetaerus – Founder of the Attalid dynasty, king of Pergamum
Philippides of Paiania – Athenian aristocratic oligarch
Philodoppides – a lyric poet
Philonides (physician)
Philip I Philadelphus – Seleucid king of Syria
Philip II of Macedon – King of Macedon
Philip II Philoromaeus – Seleucid king of Syria
Philip III of Macedon – King of Macedon
Philip IV of Macedon – King of Macedon
Philip V of Macedon – King of Macedon
Philip V of Macedon – King of Macedon
Philippus of Chollidae – neighbour of Plato
Philistus – historian
Philitas of Cos – poet and scholar
Philo – philosopher
Philo of Byblos – writer
Philolaus – philosopher
Philotas – son of Parmenion and Alexander the Great's generals
Philochorus – historian
Philocles – Athenian tragic poet
Philostephanus – a writer
Philotis (Φιλῶτις) – a woman 
Philoxenios – Indo-Greek king
Philoxenos of Eretria – painter
Philoxenus of Leucas – glutton
Philoxenus – poet
Phocion – Athenian statesman
Phocylides – poet
Phormio – Athenian general
Phryne – courtesan
Phrynichus (tragic poet) (6th-5th century BC) – playwright
Phrynichus (comic poet) (late 5th century BC) - writer of old Attic comedy
Phrynichus (oligarch) (died 411 BC) - Athenian general who took a leading part in establishing the oligarchy of the Four Hundred
Pigres of Halicarnassus – poet
Pindar – poet
Pirrone – philosopher
Pisistratus – tyrant of Athens
Pittacus of Mytilene – one of the Seven Sages of Greece
Pithios – architect
Plato – philosopher
Pleistarchus – King of Sparta
Pleistoanax – King of Sparta
Plotinus – philosopher
Plutarch – biographer
Polemon (scholarch) – Platonist philosopher
Polemon of Athens – Stoic philosopher
Polemon of Laodicea – sophist
Polybius – historian
Polycarp – Christian saint
Polycrates – tyrant of Samos
Polycrete (Πολυκρίτη) – a woman
Polydectes – King of Sparta
Polydorus – King of Sparta
Polygnotus – painter
Polykleitos – sculptor
Polyperchon – Macedonian regent
Porphyry – philosopher
Posidippus – comic poet
Posidippus – epigrammatic poet
Posidonius – philosopher
Pratinas – playwright
Praxilla – poet
Praxiteles – sculptor
Procles – King of Sparta
Proclus – philosopher
Proclus of Naucratis – rhetorician 
Procopius – prominent late antique Greek scholar from Caesarea Maritima 
Prodicus – philosopher
Protagoras – philosopher
Proteas – Athenian general
Prusias I of Bithynia – king of Bithynia
Prusias II of Bithynia – king of Bithynia
Prytanis – King of Sparta
Ptolemaeus of Alorus – military leader
Ptolemy I of Egypt – Ptolemaic ruler of Egypt
Ptolemy I of Macedon – King of Macedon
Ptolemy II of Egypt – Ptolemaic ruler of Egypt
Ptolemy III of Egypt – Ptolemaic ruler of Egypt
Ptolemy IV of Egypt – Ptolemaic ruler of Egypt
Ptolemy IX of Egypt – Ptolemaic ruler of Egypt
Ptolemy V of Egypt – Ptolemaic ruler of Egypt
Ptolemy VI of Egypt – Ptolemaic ruler of Egypt
Ptolemy VII of Egypt – Ptolemaic ruler of Egypt
Ptolemy VIII of Egypt – Ptolemaic ruler of Egypt
Ptolemy X of Egypt – Ptolemaic ruler of Egypt
Ptolemy XI of Egypt – Ptolemaic ruler of Egypt
Ptolemy XII of Egypt – Ptolemaic ruler of Egypt
Ptolemy XIII of Egypt – Ptolemaic ruler of Egypt
Ptolemy XIV of Egypt – Ptolemaic ruler of Egypt
Ptolemy – geographer
Ptolemy Philadelphus – son of Antony and Cleopatra
Ptolemy of Ascalon - grammarian
Pyrrho – philosopher
Pyrrhus of Epirus – king of Epirus
Pythagoras – mathematician
Pytheas – explorer
Pythocles – philosopher
Pythodorus – Athenian general

R

Rhianus – poet and grammarian
Rhoecus – sculptor

S

Sappho – poet
Satyros – architect
Satyros I – ruler of Bosporan Kingdom
Satyrus the Peripatetic – philosopher and historian
Scopas – sculptor
Scopas of Aetolia Aetolian politician and general.
Scylax of Caryanda – explorer
Seleucus I Nicator – Seleucid king of Syria
Seleucus II Callinicus – Seleucid king of Syria
Seleucus III Ceraunus – Seleucid king of Syria
Seleucus IV Philopator – Seleucid king of Syria
Seleucus V Philometor – Seleucid king of Syria
Seleucus VI Epiphanes – Seleucid king of Syria
Seleucus VII Kybiosaktes – Seleucid king of Syria
Sextus Empiricus – philosopher
Simmias – philosopher
Simonides of Amorgos – poet
Simonides of Ceos – poet
Socrates – philosopher
Socrates Scholasticus – Christian historian
Socrates the Younger – Platonic philosopher
Solon – Athens lawmaker, one of the Seven Sages of Greece
Soos – King of Sparta
Sopatras – philosopher
Sophocles – two; playwright, Athenian general
Sophytes – Indo-Greek king
Sosicles (statesman) – Corinthian statesman
Sosigenes – inventor of Julian calendar
Sosthenes of Macedon – King of Macedon
Sostratus – orator
Spartacus – Thracian slave
Speusippus – philosopher
Spintharus – philosopher
Spintharus of Corinth – architect
Sporus of Nicaea – mathematician
Stesichorus – poet
Stesimbrotus – writer
Sthenippus (Σθένιππος) – a Laconian
Stilpo – philosopher
Stobaeus – biographer
Strabo – geographer
Strato of Lampsacus – philosopher
Straton of Sardis – poet
Styphon – Spartan general

T
Teleclus – King of Sparta
Terence – comedic playwright
Terpander – poet and musician
Thais – courtesan
Thales – philosopher
Thallus – historian/chronographer
Theaetetus of Athens – mathematician
Theagenes of Megara – tyrant
Theagenes of Rhegium – writer
Theagenes of Thebes – general who fell at the battle of Chaeronea
Theages – pupil of Socrates
Theano – reputedly wife of Pythagoras
Themistius – philosopher and rhetor
Themistocles – archon of Athens
 Themistogenes – writer of the Anabasis, presumed since Plutarch to be Xenophon
Theocritus – poet
Theodectes – playwright
Theodorus of Samos – sculptor
Theodorus of Cyrene – mathematician
Theodorus of Gadara – rhetor
Theodotus of Byzantium – theologian
Theognis of Megara – poet
Theon of Alexandria – librarian
Theon of Smyrna – philosopher
Aelius Theon – rhetor
Theophilus – Athenian comic poet
Theophrastus – philosopher
Theopompus – three; 
King of Sparta 
comic poet
 orator
Theramenes – Athenian statesman
Therimenes – Spartan general
Theron of Acragas – tyrant of Agrigentum
Thespus – actor
Thessalus – two physicians
Thibron (Θίβρων) – Spartan general
Thorax of Lacedaemonia – Spartan soldier
Thrasippus – friend of Plato
Thrasybulus – Athenian general
Thrasyllus – Athenian general
Thrasymachus – rhetorician
Thrasymelidas – Spartan general
Thucydides – Athenian statesman
Thucydides – historian
Ticidas – erotic poet
Tidas – tyrant of Sicyon
Timachidas – writer
Timaeus of Tauromenium – historian
Timaeus of Locri – philosopher
Timagenes – teacher
Timanthes – painter
Timasitheus of Trapezus - diplomat and interpreter
Timocharis – philosopher
Timoclea – Theban lady shown mercy by Alexander the Great; sister of Theagenes of Thebes
Timocles – Middle Comedy poet
Timocrates – Spartan general
Timocreon – poet
Timoleon – Corinthian general
Timon of Phlius – philosopher
Timostratus – Athenian comic poet
Timotheus of Athens – general
Timotheus of Miletus – poet
Timotheus (sculptor) – sculptor
Tisamenus – soothsayer for the Greeks during the Greco-Persian Wars 
Tolmides – Athenian general
Triphiodorus or Tryphiodorus – epic poet
Tynnichus – poet
Tyrannion of Amisus – grammarian
Tyrimmas of Macedon – King of Macedon
Tyrtaeus – poet

U
Ulysses – see Odysseus

X

Xanthippe – wife of Socrates
Xanthippus – two; father of Pericles, Spartan mercenary
Xanthus of Sicily – poet
Xenagoras – writer
Xenarchus – Middle Comedy poet
Xenocles – two playwrights
Xenoclides – Spartan general
Xenocrates – philosopher
Xenocrates of Aphrodisias – physician
Xenophanes – philosopher
Xenophilus – philosopher
Xenophon – soldier and historian
Xenophon of Ephesus – writer

Z

Zaleucus – lawgiver of Italian Locri
Zeno of Citium – philosopher
Zeno of Elea – philosopher
Zeno of Rhodes – politician and historian
Zeno of Sidon – philosopher
Zenobius – philosopher
Zenodorus – writer
Zenodotus – grammarian
Zeuxidamas – King of Sparta
Zeuxis and Parrhasius – painters
Zoilus – grammarian
Zonis – orator
Zosimas – historian

See also
 Ancient Greece
 Archons of Athens
 Attalid dynasty
 Antigonid dynasty
 Greco-Bactrian Kingdom
 Indo-Greek kingdom
 Hellenistic Greece
 Kings of Athens
 Kings of Sparta
 List of ancient Romans
 List of ancient Greek cities
 List of ancient Greek tyrants
 List of Greeks
 Ptolemaic dynasty
 Seleucid dynasty
 National Archaeological Museum of Athens

References

Greeks
Greek